Alexa Glatch and Asia Muhammed were the defending champions, but Glatch chose not to participate. Muhammed partnered up with Yasmin Schnack and won the title, defeating Irina Falconi and Maria Sanchez in the final, 6–2, 1–6, [12–10].

Seeds

Draw

References 
 Main Draw

Coleman Vision Tennis Championships - Doubles
Coleman Vision Tennis Championships
2012 Coleman Vision Tennis Championships